The electoral district of Oatlands was a single-member electoral district of the Tasmanian House of Assembly. Its population centre was the town of Oatlands to the north of Hobart.

The seat was created ahead of the Assembly's first election held in 1856, and was abolished at the 1903 election, when it was merged with the neighbouring seats of Campbell Town and the northern part of Glamorgan into the new district of Cambria.

Members for Oatlands

References
 
 
 Parliament of Tasmania (2006). The Parliament of Tasmania from 1956

Oatlands